Helen Koral was the wife of Alexander Koral. Both were Americans who, allegedly, worked for Soviet intelligence during World War II.  The Koral's headed the "Art" or "Berg" group of Soviet spies.  The Berg group acted as couriers for various Soviet contacts, including the Silvermaster ring. Helen Koral received a regular stipend of $100 per month from the KGB and work closely with Helen Lowry, the wife of Iskhak Akhmerov, the KGB Illegal Rezident during World War II.  Her code name in the Soviet intelligence according to materials from the Venona project was "Miranda", and later changed to "Art".

Venona

1251 KGB New York to Moscow, 2 September 1944; 
1524 KGB New York to Moscow, 27 October 1944; 
1582 KGB New York to Moscow, 12 November 1944; 
1636 KGB New York to Moscow, 21 November 1944; 
1791 KGB New York to Moscow, 20 December 1944; 
1052 KGB New York to Moscow, 5 July 1945; 
337 KGB Moscow to New York, 8 April 1945.

References

Allen Weinstein and Alexander Vassiliev, The Haunted Wood: Soviet Espionage in America—the Stalin Era (New York: Random House, 1999).

 John Earl Haynes and Harvey Klehr, Venona: Decoding Soviet Espionage in America, Yale University Press (1999), pgs. 152, 353, 455.

External links
 The Cold War International History Project (CWIHP) has the full text of former KGB agent Alexander Vassiliev's Notebooks containing new evidence on Koral's cooperation with the Soviet Union

American spies for the Soviet Union
American people in the Venona papers
Espionage in the United States